Charles Barnett Fleming (28 February 1887 – 22 September 1918) was an English cricketer who played first-class cricket for Derbyshire in 1907. He died in France at the end of the First World War.

Fleming was born in Derby. He represented Derbyshire at the end of the 1907 season in a single County Championship game, a defeat against Essex. He was a right-handed batsman and made little impression, although given high order batting positions.

Fleming served in World War I and died in Grévillers, France at the age of 31.

References

1887 births
1918 deaths
English cricketers
Derbyshire cricketers
Cricketers from Derby
British military personnel killed in World War I
British military personnel of World War I
Military personnel from Derbyshire